Luigi Sala (born 21 February 1974) is a former Italian football defender. He played as a central defender.

Club career
In June 2001, Sala was sold to Atalanta for 7 billion lire, along with Gianni Comandini (30 billion) and Luca Saudati (18 billion), as part of Cristian Zenoni and Massimo Donati's deal to Milan, for 60 billion Italian lire.

In 2002–03 season, he was the first choice and partnered with Cesare Natali.
In December 2002, Sala was injured and rested one month. He returned to field on 6 January, a rescheduled round 13 match against Torino.

In June 2005, he was signed by Sampdoria.
In August 2008, he was signed by Udinese on free transfer.

He signed a two-year contract with AlbinoLeffe in 2009.

In 2010–11 season, he changed his shirt number from 26 to 21.

Italian football scandal
Sala was banned 2 year after a plea bargain on 1 August 2012 due to involvement in 2011–12 Italian football scandal. He was questioned by the prosecutor on 8 March 2012.

Honours
Milan
Serie A: 1998–99

References

External links
 Luigi Sala at FIGC.it
 Player profile

1974 births
Living people
Sportspeople from the Province of Como
Italian footballers
Association football defenders
Serie A players
Serie B players
Serie C players
S.S.C. Bari players
A.C. Milan players
Atalanta B.C. players
A.C. ChievoVerona players
Como 1907 players
U.C. Sampdoria players
Udinese Calcio players
U.C. AlbinoLeffe players
Footballers from Lombardy